Aleksei Vladimirovich Gerasimov (born 13 January 1973) is a Russian former professional footballer.

Club career
He made his professional debut in the Soviet Second League B in 1990 for FC Khimik Dzerzhinsk. He played 4 games in the UEFA Cup 1996–97 for PFC CSKA Moscow.

Honours
 Kazakhstan Premier League bronze: 2002.

References

1973 births
Living people
Soviet footballers
Russian footballers
Russia under-21 international footballers
FC Lokomotiv Nizhny Novgorod players
PFC CSKA Moscow players
FC Moscow players
Maccabi Tel Aviv F.C. players
FC Tobol players
Expatriate footballers in Israel
Russian expatriate footballers
Expatriate footballers in Kazakhstan
Russian expatriate sportspeople in Kazakhstan
Russian expatriate sportspeople in Israel
FC Oryol players
Russian Premier League players
Kazakhstan Premier League players
Association football midfielders
FC Yenisey Krasnoyarsk players
FC Khimik Dzerzhinsk players